Nancy Hopkins may refer to:

 Nancy Hopkins (aviator) (1909–1997), American aviator
 Nancy Hopkins (scientist), MIT scientist